Flying Over Grass,, is a 1969 Hong Kong action martial arts film directed by Lung Chien, and starring Ching-Ching Chang, Pin Chiang, Hsia Chiang.

Plot 

In medieval China, a lone swordswoman called, for her incredible Kung-Fu prowess, "Flight over Grass", helps a group of people defeat a warlord.

Cast

 Ching-Ching Chang 		
 Pin Chiang		
 Hsia Chiang	
 Li Chin	
 Chiang Han 		
 Bao Hsiao	
 You Hsiao	
 Chun Huang
 You-Min Ko

References

External links

1969 films
1960s action films
1960s martial arts films
1960s Cantonese-language films
Films shot in Hong Kong
Hong Kong action films
Hong Kong films about revenge
Hong Kong martial arts films
Kung fu films
1960s Mandarin-language films
Films directed by Lung Chien
1970s Hong Kong films